Beara dichromella is a moth of the family Nolidae first described by Francis Walker in 1866. It is found in Sri Lanka, and India.

Description
Forewings pinkish-grey brown. Costa sinuous and apex falcate. The caterpillar has a chocolate coloured body with short black hairlets and whitish primary setae. Anal segment is brownish orange. Thoracic segments greyish in dorsum with a quadrate orange mark. Pupa semi-ovoid without cremaster. Cocoon is woven using brown, black-speckled silk. Larval host plants are Grewia, Trema, Ziziphus, Hibiscus, Celtis and Xylia.

References

Moths of Asia
Moths described in 1866
Nolidae